Przevalski's partridge (Alectoris magna) or the rusty-necklaced partridge, is a bird species in the family Phasianidae.
It is found only in China.

Taxonomy 
Przevalski's partridge has two recognized subspecies:

 A. m. lanzhouensis  (Liu N., Huang Z., & Wen L., 2004) - Lanzhou Basin, and central Gansu (China)
 A. m. magna (Przevalski, 1876) - north to northeastern Qinghai (China)
The common name and Latin binomial commemorate the Russian explorer Nikolai Przhevalsky.

References

Przevalski's partridge
Birds of North China
Birds of Central China
Endemic birds of China
Przevalski's partridge
Taxonomy articles created by Polbot